The Health Protection (Coronavirus, Restrictions) (England) (No. 4) Regulations 2020 (SI 2020/1200) is an English statutory instrument made on 3 November 2020 by the Secretary of State for Health and Social Care, Matt Hancock, in response to the COVID-19 pandemic. 

The three sets of First COVID-19 tier regulations which had been in place since 14 October 2020 had failed to reduce the levels of COVID-19 in England, and on 5 November they were revoked and replaced with these more rigorous "second lockdown" regulations.  

Under the regulations, no-one was allowed to leave their own home without "reasonable excuse". Most social gatherings (meetings) of two or more people were prohibited unless an exception applied, but outdoor meetings of no more than two people were allowed in a public space. Most shops and many public-facing businesses were required to close, unless on an approved list. 

The regulations were initially to remain in effect between 5 November and 2 December 2020 inclusive, but they were revoked and replaced one day early by The Health Protection (Coronavirus, Restrictions) (All Tiers) (England) Regulations 2020, with those regulations coming into effect at 00:00 on 2 December.

Context and earlier regulations 
In response to the developing COVID-19 pandemic the UK government issued advice to English schools on 12 March 2020 that they should cancel trips abroad, and on 16 March that the public should avoid non-essential travel, crowded places, and visits to care homes. This was followed by the closure of schools, colleges and nurseries from 21 March.

On 21 March the government used emergency powers to make business closure regulations, enforcing the closure in England of businesses selling food and drink for consumption on the premises, as well as a range of other businesses such as nightclubs and indoor leisure centres where a high risk of infection could be expected. Five days later the restrictions were made more extensive. On 26 March 2020 the even more stringent Lockdown Regulations came into force. These became the principal delegated English legislation restricting freedom of movement, gatherings, and business closures, and were progressively relaxed on 22 April 13 May, 1 June, and 13/15 June. The No. 2 regulations of 4 July 2020 further relaxed the rules throughout most of England, apart from City of Leicester and the surrounding area which became the subject of the first of a series of local regulations.

Between July and September 2020, more extensive and increasingly rigorous ad hoc local regulations were introduced, which in many areas proved unsuccessful in controlling spread of the virus. All of these local regulations were repealed on 14 October 2020, and were replaced by the First COVID-19 tier regulations which were themselves revoked on 5 November and replaced with these more rigorous second lockdown regulations SI 2020/1200.

Legal basis 
SI 2020/1200 was introduced by way of a Statutory Instrument made by the Secretary of State for Health and Social Care, Matt Hancock, using emergency powers available to him under the Public Health (Control of Disease) Act 1984. The regulations themselves state the legal basis for using such powers, namely "the serious and imminent threat to public health which is posed by the incidence and spread of severe acute respiratory syndrome coronavirus 2 (SARS-CoV-2) in England".

The regulations were laid before parliament on 3 November 2020. The Secretary of State again used section 45R of the Public Health (Control of Disease) Act 1984 to enact the regulations on government authority, subject to retrospective approval by resolution of each House of Parliament within twenty-eight days. In the regulations themselves he stated that "by reason of urgency, it is necessary to make this instrument" without having first placed a draft before parliament for prior approval. On 4 November, however, the House of Commons was given the opportunity to vote on the regulations (but not to amend them), a vote that the government won by 516 votes to 38.

Commencement, scope and expiry

The regulations (which applied in England only) came into effect on 5 November 2020. They were set expire automatically at the end of the day of 2 December 2020.

Restrictions on leaving home 
As a general rule, no-one was allowed to leave or be outside their own home (which included any associated garden or yard) without "reasonable excuse". No exhaustive definition of "reasonable excuse" was provided, though it included any of the following exceptions:

Reasonable excuses for leaving home

Exception 1: leaving home necessary for certain purposes 
This exception covered a variety of situations:

Restrictions on gatherings 
Indoor gatherings of two or more people were entirely prohibited unless an exception applied. This also applied to gatherings in a private dwelling.

Most outdoor gatherings of two or more were also prohibited unless an exception applied, but gatherings of two people in a public outdoor place were permitted. Children under the age of five and up to two carers for a person with a disability were not counted for this purpose.

Exceptions to the general prohibition against gatherings

Linked households 
A household containing exactly one adult (no more) and any number of children could form a permanent link with one other household of any size (such linked households were referred to in government statements as "support bubbles"). Households which were already linked under earlier regulations could not link with any other household.

Linked childcare households 
A household with at least one child aged 13 or under could link with another household providing informal childcare. In order to link, all adults in both households had to agree. Each household was allowed a single linked childcare household only, which could not be changed; multiple links were not permitted.

Business closures and restrictions

Enforcement 
Breaches of the regulations were offences and could be prosecuted or dealt with by fixed penalty notices with penalties ranging up to £10,000 for repeated violations.

References

Bibliography

External links
 Guidance: New National Restrictions from 5 November – Cabinet Office, 31 October 2020, updated several times
 Guidance: Closing certain businesses and venues in England – Cabinet Office, updated 5 November
 Guidance: Maintaining records of staff, customers and visitors to support NHS Test and Trace – Department of Health and Social Care, updated 5 November

Statutory Instruments of the United Kingdom
2020 in England
COVID-19 pandemic in England
Public health in the United Kingdom
2020 in British law
Law associated with the COVID-19 pandemic in the United Kingdom